Jürgen Roland, born Jürgen Schellack (25 December 1925 – 21 September 2007) was a German film director. Roland was described as the "father of German TV crime shows". He directed about 80 TV productions and 30 movies.

Life and career
Roland was born on 25 December 1925 in Hamburg as Jürgen Schellack. He started his career as a radio host for the North western German Radio Station (NWDR) in 1945, and was one of the first presenters for the TV station of the NWDR in 1951. Norddeutscher Rundfunk Station Manager  said, that Jürgen Roland "[...] belonged to the ranks of young radio reporter, who contributed after the war to the legendary reputation of the then NWDR." Roland's first TV series Der Polizeibericht meldet ... (lit. the police reports ...) was a detailed description of real crimes, filmed accurate and faithful.

The TV series Stahlnetz (lit. steel net, Dragnet) caused Roland's fame. For the 1958s crime series, Roland worked with screenwriter Wolfgang Menge. The cases were based on real crimes also, and the series was a blockbuster in Germany. After his work for the TV station Roland directed several movies, the 1960s Der grüne Bogenschütze (The Green Archer)—starring Gert Fröbe—was based on an Edgar Wallace's novel of 1923.

Roland directed several Tatort (crime scene) episodes, and as of 2007, Roland's TV series Großstadtrevier (metropolitan precinct) was shown for 21 years in German TV.

Filmography
 1950: Only One Night (Director: Fritz Kirchhoff)
 1955: Netz über Bord – Heringsfang auf der Nordsee (documentary)
 1959: For Love and Others (anthology film)
 1960: The Crimson Circle — based on The Crimson Circle by Edgar Wallace
 1961: The Green Archer — based on The Green Archer by Edgar Wallace
 1961:  — based on a novel by 
 1961: The Strange Countess (Director: Josef von Báky) — based on The Strange Countess by Edgar Wallace
 1962: The Hot Port of Hong Kong
 1963: The Black Panther of Ratana
 1964: The Pirates of the Mississippi — based on a novel by Friedrich Gerstäcker
 1964: 
 1965:  (TV film) — based on Lay Her Among the Lilies by James Hadley Chase
 1966: 4 Schlüssel — based on a novel by 
 1967: Lotus Flowers for Miss Quon — based on A Lotus for Miss Quon by James Hadley Chase
 1968:  (TV film) — based on a novel by 
 1969: Angels of the Street
 1971: 
 1973: The Girl from Hong Kong — based on a novel by Herbert Reinecker
 1973:  (Battle of the Godfathers)

 1984: Der Besuch (TV film) — based on a play by Francis Durbridge
 1995: Peter Strohm (TV series episode: Die Gräfin)

Stahlnetz 

German TV series for the Norddeutscher Rundfunk, based on real crimes. Roland directed 22 episodes and was screenwriter for 2 episodes. The series is filmed in black and white, the first episode of season 1 was aired 1958. German actors Hellmut Lange and Helmut Peine were in the cast.
 1958: 
 1958: 
 1958: 
 1958: 
 1958: 
 1958: 
 1959: 
 1959: 
 1959: 
 1960: 
 1960: 
 1960: 
 1961: 
 1961: 
 1962: 
 1962: 
 1963: 
 1964: 
 1964: 
 1965: 
 1966: 
 1968:

Dem Täter auf der Spur 

 1967: Am Rande der Manege
 1967: 10 Kisten Whisky
 1968: Schrott
 1969: Das Fenster zum Garten
 1969: Familienärger
 1970: Frau gesucht…
 1970: Puppen reden nicht
 1970: Froschmänner
 1970: Schlagzeile: Mord
 1971: Tod am Steuer
 1971: Flugstunde
 1972: In Schönheit sterben
 1972: Ohne Kranz und Blumen
 1972: Der Tod in der Maske
 1972: Kein Hafer für Nicolo
 1973: Blinder Haß
 1973: Stellwerk 3

Tatort 

 1976:  (with Uwe Dallmeier as Polizeiobermeister Hesse)
 1977:  (with Horst Bollmann as MAD-Officer Delius)
 1979:  (with Horst Bollmann as MAD-Officer Delius)
 1982:  (with Klaus Löwitsch as Policeman Rolfs)
 1983:  (with Horst Bollmann as MAD-Officer Delius)
 1985:  (with Klaus Löwitsch as Policeman Dietze)
 1985:  (with Horst Bollmann as MAD-Officer Delius)
 1989:  (with Heinz Drache as Police Inspector Bülow)
 1991: Tod eines Mädchens (with Manfred Krug as Police Inspector Stoever)
 1992: Stoevers Fall (with Manfred Krug as Police Inspector Stoever)
 1995: Tod eines Polizisten (with Manfred Krug as Police Inspector Stoever)
 1997: Ausgespielt (with Manfred Krug as Police Inspector Stoever)

As actor
 1988: Pleitegeier, as Anton Marek
 2001: Tod vor Scharhörn, as Polizeipräsident von Hamburg (Head of the Hamburg Police Department)

Großstadtrevier 

Roland directed 46 episodes of the German TV series Großstadtrevier (metropolitan precinct), produced by the Norddeutscher Rundfunk.
 1986: Kein Tag wie jeder andere
 1986: Wühlmäuse
 1986: Mensch, der Bulle ist 'ne Frau
 1986: Speedy
 1986: Prosit Neujahr
 1987: Amamos und Konsorten
 1987: Der Champ
 1987: Fahrerflucht
 1987: Rote Karte für Thomas?
 1989: Dame in Not (Kommentator)
 1991: Das schwarze Schaf
 1991: Treffpunkt Kino
 1992: Der Neue (including Roland's voice)
 1992: Auf Gift gebaut (appearances as officer-in-charge)
 1992: Revanche (appearance as hall speaker)
 1997: Der Praktikant
 1997: Das Stuntgirl
 1997: Die Aufsteiger
 1999: Zeugen

References

External links 
 
 
 Jürgen Roland with three pictures at filmportal.de

1925 births
2007 deaths
Mass media people from Hamburg
Officers Crosses of the Order of Merit of the Federal Republic of Germany
Norddeutscher Rundfunk people